All Jets Are Gonna Fall Today is the debut full-length album by the American band Chocolate USA. Released in 1992, it was their first album for Bar/None Records. It was recorded under the band's former name, Miss America.

Critical reception
Trouser Press wrote that "Chocolate USA is nothing if not eclectic; although most of the album is acoustic slacker pop, 'Skyphilis/Air Raid' kicks off as a pastiche of Tommy Dorsey’s big band sound and glides into an extended free-jazz fantasy." The Tampa Bay Times called the album "rife with fragmented genius, nervous energy and a creative vibe so powerful, it could send shivers down a spine of stainless steel." The Times Union considered it a "wonderfully wild pastiche of pop."

Track listing 
 Test (Julian Koster) :40
 All Jets Are Gonna Fall Today (Koster)  – 3:14
 Doogie Love Theme/Wysotsky's Tea (Koster)  – 2:25
 My Little Two Eyes (Koster)  – 3:04
 100 Feet Tall (Koster)  – 2:36
 The Feelies Show (Eric Morrison)  – 3:02
 Skyphilis/Air Raid (Koster)  – 3:46
 The Shower Song (Koster)  – 3:57
 Wash My Face (Koster)  – 4:32
 Two Dogs (Koster)	 – 1:58
 Vocal Exercise No. 1 (Koster) :32
 The Crashing Song (Koster)  – 2:33
 Luniks Furniture (Koster)  – 2:39
 Kriss Ford (Koster)	 – 2:43
 Kathy (Koster)  – 1:38
 Nervous Aged Catalunian (Koster)  – 3:07
 Loud (Koster)  – 4:22
 Smile (Koster)  – 3:27
 She's an Aeroplane (Koster)  – 4:21

Personnel
Julian Koster - vocals, guitar, bass
Liza Wakeman - violin

References 

1992 albums